Mohammad Ashir Qureshi (born 12 August 2001) is a Pakistani cricketer who plays for Sindh. He made his Twenty20 debut on 28 January 2022, for Quetta Gladiators in the 2022 Pakistan Super League.

References

External Links
 

2001 births
Living people
Pakistani cricketers
Quetta Gladiators cricketers
Sindh cricketers
Cricketers from Karachi